Verkhniy Karalar may refer to:
Qaralar, Imishli, Azerbaijan
Yuxarı Qaralar, Azerbaijan